Javier Mora may refer to:

 Javier Mora (boxer) (born 1981), Mexican boxer
 Javier Ostos Mora (1916–2008), lawyer and sport politician from Mexico

See also
 Mora (disambiguation)